Peter H. Diamandis (born May 20, 1961) is a Greek-American marketer, engineer, physician, and entrepreneur best known for being founder and chairman of the X Prize Foundation, cofounder and executive chairman of Singularity University and coauthor of The New York Times bestsellers Abundance: The Future Is Better Than You Think, The Future is Faster than You Think, How Converging Technologies Are Transforming Business, Industries, and Our Lives and BOLD: How to Go Big, Create Wealth, and Impact the World. He is former CEO and cofounder of the Zero Gravity Corporation, cofounder and vice chairman of Space Adventures Ltd., founder and chairman of the Rocket Racing League, cofounder of the International Space University, cofounder of Planetary Resources, cofounder of Celularity, founder of Students for the Exploration and Development of Space, vice chairman and cofounder of Human Longevity, Inc.

Early life

Diamandis was born in The Bronx, New York. His parents, both Greek immigrants, were in the medical business. His father was a physician. From a very early age, Diamandis expressed a keen interest in space exploration. At age 8, he began giving lectures on space to his family and friends. At age 12, Diamandis won first place in the Estes Rocket Design Competition for building a launch system able to simultaneously launch three rockets.

After graduating from Great Neck North High School in 1979, Diamandis attended Hamilton College for his first year, then transferred to the Massachusetts Institute of Technology to study biology and physics. During his second year at MIT in 1980, Diamandis cofounded Students for the Exploration and Development of Space.

After graduating from MIT in 1983 he entered Harvard Medical School to pursue his M.D. During his second year of medical school, he cofounded the Space Generation Foundation to promote projects and programs that would help the "Space Generation"—all those born since the flight of Sputnik—get off the planet.

In 1986, Diamandis put his medical degree on hold and returned to MIT to pursue a master's degree in aeronautics and astronautics, conducting research at NASA Johnson Space Center, the MIT Man Vehicle Laboratory and MIT's Whitehead Biomedical Institute. After completing his M.S. at MIT, Diamandis returned to Harvard completing his M.D.

During his last year of medical school in 1989, Diamandis was acting as managing director of the International Space University and CEO of International Micro Space, a microsatellite launch company.

Career
Diamandis has participated on the boards of several companies throughout his career, including Hyperloop and Cogswell Polytechnical College. He has also won several awards in his field, including Economist "No Boundaries" Innovator of the Year, the Neil Armstrong Award for Aerospace Achievement and Leadership, the World Technology Award, presented by the World Technology Counsel, and  the Arthur C. Clarke Award for Innovation, among others.

International Space University

In 1987, during his third year of medical school, Diamandis cofounded International Space University with Todd Hawley, Walter Anderson, Christopher Mau and Robert Richards.  Diamandis served as the managing director and chief operating officer of the university until 1989. Today, ISU offers a Space Studies program and two accredited Master of Space Studies degrees. It has grown into a $30 million university campus headquartered in Strasbourg, France.

International MicroSpace, Inc.

Diamandis cofounded Microsat Launch Systems, later renamed International MicroSpace Inc., in 1989 during his fourth year of medical school and served as the company's CEO. IMI designed a small launcher called Orbital Express for taking 100-kg payloads to low-Earth orbit, collaborating with Bristol Aerospace for the manufacture. The company won a $100 million SDIO contract for one launch plus nine options and was sold to CTA Inc of Rockville, MD in 1993 for $250,000. Diamandis joined CTA for one year as VP of Commercial Space Programs post-acquisition.

Constellation Communications
In 1991, Diamandis founded Constellation Communications, Inc., one of five low-Earth orbit satellite constellations for voice telephony. The company was funded to deploy an equatorial ring of 10 satellites to provide communications primarily to Brazil and Indonesia. Constellation was sold to E-Systems and Orbital; Diamandis remained director until 1993.

X PRIZE Foundation

In 1994, Diamandis founded the X PRIZE Foundation after the failure of International MicroSpace, Inc and reading Charles Lindbergh's The Spirit of St. Louis. He serves as chairman and CEO of the foundation. X PRIZE was created to fund and operate a $10 million incentive competition intended to inspire a new generation of private passenger-carrying spaceships. The prize was announced on May 18, 1996, in St. Louis, MO without any purse money or any teams. The prize was ultimately funded through an insurance policy underwritten by the Anousheh and Hamid Ansari Family and renamed the Ansari X PRIZE in their honor.

The $10 million competition attracted 26 teams from seven countries as teams and was won on October 4, 2004, by Mojave Aerospace Ventures, a team run by famed aviation designer Burt Rutan and funded by Microsoft cofounder Paul Allen. The winning vehicle, SpaceShipOne, was piloted to space twice within two weeks to win the competition. The first flight was made on September 29, 2004, piloted by Mike Melvill, and the winning, second flight was made on October 4, 2004, by pilot Brian Binnie. SpaceShipOne was the world's first non-government piloted spacecraft and is now hanging in the National Air and Space Museum adjacent to the Spirit of St. Louis aircraft.

In January 2005, the X PRIZE Foundation Board of Trustees expanded the focus of the X PRIZE to address four different group areas: Exploration (oceans and space), Life Sciences, Energy and Environment, and Education and Global Development.

Since inception, the foundation has launched the $10M Ansari X PRIZE (awarded), the $10M Automotive X Prize (awarded), the $10M Archon X Prize (in progress), the $30M Google Lunar X PRIZE (in progress), the $10M Qualcomm Tricorder X PRIZE, the $2M Lunar Lander Challenge (awarded), the $1.4M Wendy Schmidt Oil Cleanup X Challenge (awarded), and the Wendy Schmidt Ocean Health X PRIZE. In May 2012, the Robin Hood Foundation announced its plans to partner with the X PRIZE Foundation for several New York-based challenges targeted at eradicating poverty.

The X PRIZE Foundation has a staff of approximately 50 individuals and is headquartered in Culver City, California. Its board of trustees includes Larry Page, Elon Musk, James Cameron, Dean Kamen, Ratan Tata, Ray Kurzweil, Jim Gianopulos, Naveen Jain, Arianna Huffington, Will Wright and Craig Venter.

Zero Gravity Corporation
In 1994, Diamandis cofounded ZERO-G with Byron Lichtenberg and Ray Cronise. The space entertainment company offers weightless experiences aboard its FAA-certified Boeing 727 aircraft and provides NASA with parabolic flight services for research, education and training. The company has flown over 10,000 customers.

In 2007, physicist Stephen Hawking experienced eight rounds of weightlessness on a ZERO-G flight. Diamandis said that the successful outcome of that flight was proof that "everyone can participate in this type of weightless experience." He would recount the experience of taking Dr. Hawking into the upper atmosphere at TED2008.

Angel Technologies Corporation
Between 1995 and 1999, Diamandis was the president of Angel Technologies Corporation, a commercial communications company that develops wireless broadband communications networks.

Space Adventures, Ltd.
Founded in 1998, Space Adventures is a space tourism company that has flown eight private customer missions to the International Space Station since 2001. Diamandis is the cofounder and vice chairman of Space Adventures.

BlastOff! Corporation
Between 1999 and 2001, Diamandis was the CEO of BlastOff! Corporation, which proposed to fly a private rover mission to land on the Moon as a mix of entertainment, Internet and space. Diamandis commented on how the initial startup cost for the project was in the region of five million dollars, which was necessary to cover the costs of the servers, bandwidth and software. The company lost funding and ceased business in 2001.

Rocket Racing League
In 2005, Diamandis cofounded the Rocket Racing League. Developed as a cross between IndyCar racing and rockets, it envisioned enabling the public to enjoy speed, rockets and competitive spirits. Diamandis was the chairman of RRL until it ceased business.

Singularity University

In 2008, alongside American author, inventor and futurist Ray Kurzweil, Diamandis cofounded Singularity University (SU). Today Diamandis serves as the university's cofounder and executive chairman. SU is an interdisciplinary university based on the NASA Ames campus in Silicon Valley and supported by a number of corporate founders and partners including Autodesk, Cisco, Nokia, Kauffman Foundation and ePlanet Ventures. The university runs a 10-week Graduate Studies Program, a seven-day Executive Program and a five-day Exponential Medicine conference.

Planetary Resources Inc.
In April 2012, Diamandis cofounded Planetary Resources Inc., an organization dedicated to the identification, remote sensing and prospecting of near-Earth approaching asteroids, with Eric Anderson. He has also served on the company's board. and Charles Simonyi. Following financial troubles, it was announced in October 2018 that the company's human assets were purchased by the blockchain software technology company ConsenSys, Inc.

Human Longevity Inc.
In March 2014, Diamandis cofounded Human Longevity Inc. (HLI), a genomics and cell therapy-based diagnostic and therapeutic company focused on extending the healthy human lifespan, with Craig Venter and Robert Hariri. He also has supported SENS Research Foundation, a nonprofit organization that seeks to treat and cure the diseases of aging by repairing the underlying damage caused by aging. After internal disputes about management, Venter left Human Longevity to return to the Venter Institute.

Celularity

In February 2018, Diamandis launched Celularity, a biotechnology company productizing allogeneic cells and tissues derived from the postpartum placenta.

Books

In 2012, alongside Steven Kotler, Diamandis coauthored Abundance: The Future Is Better Than You Think. The nonfiction work discusses the potential for exponential technology and three other emerging market forces to significantly raise global standards of living within the next 25 years.

Abundance was well-received; it was No. 2 on The New York Times Best Seller list and remained on the list for nine weeks. It was No. 1 on the non-fiction bestseller lists of Amazon and Barnes and Noble.

At the 2014 Clinton Global Initiative, former US president Bill Clinton recommended Abundance to readers as an antidote to negative news.

In 2015, again alongside of Steven Kotler, Diamandis coauthored another New York Times best selling book, Bold: How to Go Big, Create Wealth, and Impact the World. This nonfiction book provides analysis and instruction for entrepreneurs interested in learning about exponential technologies, moon-shot thinking and crowdsourcing.

January 28, 2020, Kotler and Diamandis released the third and final book in their series "The Exponential Mindset Trilogy"; which includes the books "Abundance" and "Bold". The Future is Faster Than You Think: How Converging Technologies are Transforming Business, Industries, and Our Lives examines the revolutionary changes brought about by convergence.

Diamandis also has a chapter giving advice in Tim Ferriss' book Tools of Titans.

Additional notable achievements
Diamandis also:
 Served as CEO of Desktop.tv, a spin-off company from BlastOff! designed to provide a global peer-to-peer television network for broadcasting unique content to the desktop. 
 Served as chairman of Starport.com, an Internet channel for space exploration for kids of all ages. The site represents over 20 astronauts and features space heroes, missions and simulations. Sold to Space.com.
 Cofounded and served as director of the Space Generation Foundation, a nonprofit organization established in 1985 to create, in all people born since the advent of the Space Age on October 4, 1957, a sense of identity and awareness that they are born as members of a space-faring race. The foundation supports numerous educational and research projects. 
 Founded SpaceFair in 1983. SpaceFair is a national space conference that was hosted by MIT in 1983, 1985 and 1987. 
 Was a key subject in the 2007 documentary film, Orphans of Apollo.
 Is a member of the Xconomists, an ad hoc team of editorial advisors for the tech news and media company, Xconomy.

Personal life
Diamandis is married to Kristen Hladecek, having proposed in 2004. They have twin boys born c. 2012.

Santa Monica event 
In February 2021, during the COVID-19 pandemic, MIT Technology Review reported that Diamandis held a "mostly maskless" event in Santa Monica in violation of the local stay-at-home order that became a superspreading event. The event charged up to $30,000 for tickets. In a followup article, MIT Technology Review revealed that after COVID-19 started spreading among attendees, Diamandis tried to sell them "fraudulent" treatments including inhaled amniotic fluid and ketamine lozenges, which a professor of law and medicine at Stanford University characterized as "quackery". The superspreading event was covered widely by publications including the New York Times and the Los Angeles Times.

See also
List of Greek Americans

Notes

External links
 
 X PRIZE Foundation website
 Testimony by Peter Diamandis to U.S. House

Videos
 
 Peter Diamandis: Our next giant leap (TEDGlobal 2005)
 Peter Diamandis: Stephen Hawking's zero g flight (TED2008)
 Peter Diamandis: Abundance is our future (TED2012)
 MIT Video: Peter Diamandis talks about the X PRIZE and future of space travel
 Open SSP08 Lecture: Peter Diamandis talks about the X PRIZE, Zero gravity, Rocket Race League SSP08 podcast
 Perimeter Institute: Peter Diamandis' lecture at the Quantum to Cosmos festival

1961 births
Living people
American chief executives
Harvard Medical School alumni
Massachusetts Institute of Technology School of Science alumni
X Prizes
Space advocates
People from the Bronx
American people of Greek descent
Great Neck North High School alumni
Life extensionists
Singularitarians